Lu Yi-ching (born 23 October 1958) is a Taiwanese actress. She has appeared in several films directed by Tsai Ming-liang, such as What Time Is It There? and The Wayward Cloud, and films by Cheng Wen-tang, including Blue Cha Cha. Lu lives in Taipei.

Filmography

Film 
 We Are Champions (2019)
 Han Dan (2019)
 Pigeon Tango (2017)
 Turn Around (2017)
 Forêt Debussy (2016)
 Rookie Chef (2016)
 When Miracle Meets Maths (2015)
 The Boar King (2014)
 Stray Dogs (2013)
 Blowfish (2011)
 Face (2009)
 A Place of One's Own (2009)
 Drifting Flowers (2008)
 Shen xuan zhe (2007), English title: Brotherhood of Legion
 Xiatian de weiba (2007), English title: Summer's Tail
 Tian tang kou (2007) (under "Lu Xiao Lin"), English title: Blood Brothers
 Ai li si de jin zi (2005), English title: Reflections
 Blue Cha Cha (2005)
 Zhaibian (2005), English title: The Heirloom
 The Wayward Cloud (2005)
 Bu jian (2003), English title: The Missing
 The Skywalk Is Gone (2002)
 What Time Is It There? (2001)
 The River (1997) (as Hsiao-Ling Lu)
 Vive L'Amour (1994)
 Rebels of the Neon God (1992) (as Hsiao-Ling Lu)

Music video appearances

Awards and nominations

References

External links

Lu Yi-ching at chinesemov.com

 

1958 births
Living people
Taiwanese Buddhists
20th-century Taiwanese actresses
21st-century Taiwanese actresses
Taiwanese film actresses
Taiwanese television actresses